Lohen Forest Park is a forest park in the Gambia. Established on January 1, 1954, it covers 85 hectares.

References

Protected areas established in 1954
Forest parks of the Gambia